Chao Chuan (born 18 June 1961), known sometimes as "Chief" Chao, is a Taiwanese pop singer.

His breakthrough came with the song "I'm Ugly, but I'm Tender" which was a giant hit in mainland China in 1988. His next major hit was "I'm Just a Little Bird" (1990).

Albums
 (1988)
At Last, I Have Lost You (1989)
I'm Just a Little Bird (1990)
Chao Chuan Four (1991) 
You Are Always on my Mind (1991)
Promise (1993)
Finest Selection (1994)
Love Me Then Give Me (1994)
I Should Have Loved You From The Start (1995）
Hero in the Darkness 黑暗的英雄（1996）
Star of Hope (1997)
Deep Sea – EP (1997)
A Little Braver (1999）insert card Courage, also known as Be Brave (Billboard)
The Fool Who Ever Loved You (2001)
Martial Hero of Music (2012)
How Have You Been (2017)

References

Taiwanese male singers
1961 births
Living people
Taiwanese pop singers